Michael Silversher and Patricia (Patty) Silversher, sometimes billed as Silversher & Silversher, are an American songwriting team known for writing themes and songs for Disney and Jim Henson television series, shows and specials, as well as direct-to-video animated films for Disney, Henson, Sony Wonder, MGM and Warner Bros. They participated on the Grammy Award-winning soundtrack album for the Sony-CTW film The Adventures of Elmo in Grouchland. They have also been nominated for three prime-time Emmy Awards for outstanding music and lyrics.

Formerly married, Michael Silversher and Patty Silversher continue their collaboration in children's music. They scored the Jim Henson/PBS show Dinosaur Train, that began to air in September 2009. They created the scores for 95 of the 100 episodes now showing all over the world.

They have also created songs and all the scores for the Henson/Netflix co-production of "Word Party" since its inception in 2012. They wrote songs for "Sid The Science Kid" and they were the music supervisors, composers and lyricists for the Henson, 4Kids and Sprout production Pajanimals, back in 2008.

Songs
Some of their work includes:
 Disney's Adventures of the Gummi Bears — "Gummi Bears Theme", "Gummiberry Juice", "Rough, Tough, Burly Sailor Song"
 TaleSpin — "Tale Spin Theme (Spin It!)", "I'm Gone", "Home Is Where the Heart Is", "Sky Pirates (I'm a Pirate)", "Monkey In Your Tank"
 Chip 'n Dale Rescue Rangers —  "Fat Cat Stomp", "The Best of Everything", "You're the Best Bee for Me"
 DuckTales — "The Boogie Beagle Blues", "Bubba Duck Theme"
 Donald Duck's 50th Birthday (1984) — "Happy, Happy Birthday to You (Donald Duck version)" and "Can You Quack Like Donald Duck?"
 The Return of Jafar (1994) — "Forget About Love", "Nothing In the World"
 The Little Mermaid (TV series) (1993) — "In Harmony"
 The Little Mermaid II: Return to the Sea (2000) — "Down to the Sea", "For a Moment", "Tip and Dash", "Here on the Land and Sea"
 Boo to You Too! Winnie the Pooh (1996) — "I Am Not Afraid", "I Wanna Scare Myself" (Emmy nominated song)
 Winnie the Pooh: A Valentine for You (1999) — "Girls Are Like Boys", "When the Love Bug Bites", "Places in the Heart"
 "Together Forever" from The Adventures of Elmo in Grouchland (1999), Grammy-Award winner for Best Musical Album for Children
 Songs for Muppet Classic Theater (1994)
 Songs for Mr. Willowby's Christmas Tree (1995), Emmy nominee for the song "The Perfect Tree"
 Songs for Jim Henson's Animal Jam (2003)
 Songs and score for Pajanimals (2008–2013)
 Songs and score for Dinosaur Train (2009–2019)

Michael Silversher also has a songwriting credit on Raffi's 1994 album Bananaphone, for the song "The Changing Garden of Mr. Bell" which he wrote with singer/songwriter, Janice Hubbard. He was founding musical director and resident songwriter for Robert Redford's Sundance Institute's Children's Theater and Sundance Institute's Playwrights' Lab from 1991 until 1996. He wrote and arranged most of the Mickey Mouse Splashdance album from Disneyland Records' WDL series.  He has written operas for Los Angeles Opera and Kennedy Center in Washington, D.C., and a musical, The Lively Lad, shown at the Humana Festival of New American Plays. Michael was commissioned by The Kennedy Center to write the music for Knuffle Bunny: A Cautionary Musical, in collaboration with author Mo Willems, which premiered in 2010.

References

External links
 
 

Songwriting teams
American songwriters
Disney people